The Mackintosh School of Architecture (MSA) is one of the five schools which make up the Glasgow School of Art, situated in the Garnethill area of Glasgow, Scotland. The Mackintosh School of Architecture is the Glasgow School of Art's only academic school concerned with a single discipline.

The school is based in the Bourdon Building, named after the French architect Eugene Bourdon, the first Professor of Architecture at the Glasgow School of Art.

History 
Architecture has been a part of the teaching at the GSA from the middle of the 19th century. Taught on a part-time basis until 1968, the School boasts Charles Rennie Mackintosh and two of Glasgow's most notable modern architects, Andy MacMillan and Isi Metzstein of the architectural practice Gillespie, Kidd & Coia, amongst its most eminent alumni.
 
Since 1968, the programmes have been predominantly for full-time students, but it continues to be Scotland's only school of architecture to offer part-time mode of study.

Past graduates
 Gareth Hoskins
 Andy MacMillan
 Isi Metzstein
 Alan Dunlop
 James Gowan
 Andrew Whalley
 Andy Bow

External links
 Glasgow School of Art home page
 Mac Website

 
Architecture schools in Scotland
Schools of the University of Glasgow
1970 establishments in Scotland
Educational institutions established in 1970